East Hibbard Township is a township in Kearny County, Kansas, USA.  As of the 2000 census, its population was 131.

Geography
East Hibbard Township covers an area of 155.58 square miles (402.94 square kilometers).

Adjacent townships
 Valley Township, Scott County (northeast)
 Terry Township, Finney County (east)
 Sherlock Township, Finney County (southeast)
 Deerfield Township (south)
 Lakin Township (south)
 Hartland Township (southwest)
 West Hibbard Township (west)
 Leoti Township, Wichita County (northwest)

Major highways
 K-25 (Kansas highway)

Airports and landing strips
 Dienst Ranch Airport

References
 U.S. Board on Geographic Names (GNIS)
 United States Census Bureau cartographic boundary files

External links
 US-Counties.com
 City-Data.com

Townships in Kearny County, Kansas
Townships in Kansas